Jinqiu Road is a metro station on the Line 15 of the Shanghai Metro. Located at the intersection of Qilianshan Road and Jinqiu Road in Putuo District, Shanghai, the station was scheduled to open with the rest of Line 15 by the end of 2020. However, the station eventually opened on 23 January 2021 following a one-month postponement. It is located in between  station to the north and  station to the south.

Originally, the northern terminus of Line 15 was intended to be at Qihua Road. However, on 28 December 2011, Line 15 was shifted to instead terminate at Jinqiu Road station, which would provide no direct connection to Line 7. This has stirred controversy among residents over Line 15's already lack of convenient connections with other major metro lines such as Line 2 and Line 10. Passengers who wish to interchange between Lines 7 and 15 must use Gucun Park station, even though the closest Line 7 station from Jinqiu Road is Shanghai University. It remains to be seen whether an out-of-station transfer will be allowed between the two stations.

References 

Railway stations in Shanghai
Shanghai Metro stations in Baoshan District
Line 15, Shanghai Metro
Railway stations in China opened in 2021